Laurier station is a Montreal Metro station in the borough of Le Plateau-Mont-Royal in Montreal, Quebec, Canada. It is operated by the Société de transport de Montréal (STM) and serves the Orange Line. It is located just to the east of the Mile End neighbourhood. The station opened on October 14, 1966, as part of the original network of the Metro.

Overview 
The station, designed by Jean P. Pothier, is a normal side platform station, built in tunnel. It has a mezzanine and an entrance at either end, the southern one incorporating an open sided bus shelter, and the northern one including an automatic ticket barrier.

The walls are decorated in grey granite, with orange and red tiles at both ends of the platform.

Origin of the name
This station is named for Laurier Avenue, named for Sir Wilfrid Laurier (1841–1919), the first French-Canadian Prime Minister of Canada (1896–1911).

Connecting bus routes

Nearby points of interest

École nationale de théâtre
École supérieure de la danse du Québec
Plaza Laurier
Parc Sir-Wilfrid-Laurier
CLSC Saint-Louis-du-Parc

References

External links
Laurier Station - official site
Montreal by Metro, metrodemontreal.com - photos, information, and trivia
 2011 STM System Map
 Metro Map

Orange Line (Montreal Metro)
Le Plateau-Mont-Royal
Railway stations in Canada opened in 1966